The European Junior Shooting Championships are the main shooting championships in Europe organize by European Shooting Confederation (ESC).

European Junior Shooting Championships (25, 50, Running Target)

Results
 http://www.issf-sports.org/competitions/historicalmedalwinners.ashx
 http://www.issf-sports.org/competitions/results.ashx
 https://results.sius.com/Championships.aspx
 http://www.esc-shooting.org/documents/results/
 http://www.esc-shooting.org/documents/european_championships/
 http://www.the-sports.org/shooting-sports-european-shotgun-and-running-target-championships-2018-epr84349.html

See also
List of medalists at the European Shooting Championship

References
ISSF Results Overview

European youth sports competitions
European
Shooting sports in Europe by country